Catholic Party may refer to:

 Catholic Party (Belgium)
 Catholic Party (Indonesia)
 Catholic Party (Liverpool)

See also 
 :Category:Catholic political parties